Terry A. Nylander (born 1 January 1946) is a former Progressive Conservative party member of the House of Commons of Canada. Born in North Battleford, Saskatchewan, he was a farmer by career.

Nylander represented Saskatchewan's The Battlefords—Meadow Lake electoral district which he won in the 1979 federal election. After serving his only term, the 31st Canadian Parliament, he was defeated in the 1980 federal election by Douglas Anguish of the New Democratic Party.

External links
 

1946 births
Living people
Members of the House of Commons of Canada from Saskatchewan
Progressive Conservative Party of Canada MPs